This is a list of earthquakes in 1957. Only magnitude 6.0 or greater earthquakes appear on the list. Lower magnitude events are included if they have caused death, injury or damage. Events which occurred in remote areas will be excluded from the list as they wouldn't have generated significant media interest. All dates are listed according to UTC time. The very active year started its major activity with a magnitude 8.6 earthquake in Alaska in March. This event was one of the largest on record in the United States and was followed by an energetic aftershock sequence which resulted in 6 aftershocks measuring greater than magnitude 7.0. Mongolia was affected by the strong 1957 Mongolia earthquake. Turkey and especially Iran had several earthquakes with high death tolls.

Overall

By death toll 

 Note: At least 10 casualties

By magnitude 

 Note: At least 7.0 magnitude

Notable events

January

February

March

April

May

June

July

August

September

October

November

December

References

1957
 
1957